Nordkrone (meaning "Northern Crown") is a mountainous area in Peary Land, Northern Greenland. Administratively it is part of the Northeast Greenland National Park.

Fossils dating back to the Silurian have been found in the area of the range. They belong to the Nordkronen Formation of the Peary Land Group.

History
The mountain was mapped by Danish Arctic explorer Lauge Koch during his Cartographic Air Expedition of 1938. He named it after the "North Crown", which symbolically crowns the world's northernmost country. The most conspicuous peak in the area had been previously named by Robert Peary as Mount Wistar (Wistars Fjeld). In 1950 Eigil Knuth, the leader of the Danish Peary Land Expedition, asserted that the mountain was part of Nordkrone, and described it as "the strangest and proudest peak" of Peary Land:

Geography
Nordkrone is located in central Peary Land, to the south of Frederick E. Hyde Fjord, describing an arc to the east and northwest of the head of the Freja Fjord, around the Balder Glacier flowing from the south. The Børglum River (Børglum Elv) flows southward from Nordkrone to Brønlund Fjord.
Nordkrone is variously described as a plateau and as a ridge. The surface of Nordkrone is plateau-like with ridges attaining high elevations and an ice cap out of which flow many glaciers. Its slopes are intersected by deep ravines with steep sides. 

It rises at the northwestern end, west of the Balder Glacier.

See also
List of fossiliferous stratigraphic units in Greenland
List of mountains in Greenland
List of rivers of Greenland
Mara Mountain

Bibliography
Greenland geology and selected mineral occurrences - GEUS

References

External links
Greenland - Jeff Shea

Mountains of Greenland
Peary Land